NextEra Energy Partners LP, a publicly traded subsidiary of NextEra Energy, is a Juno Beach, Florida-based renewable energy company.

History 
NextEra Energy Partners is a limited partnership formed in 2014 by NextEra Energy.

In June 2014, NextEra Energy announced an initial public offering for NextEra Energy Partners after the previously wholly owned subsidiary was approved for listing on the New York Stock Exchange under the symbol "NEP." Bank of America Merrill Lynch and Goldman Sachs structured the offering.

On January 9, 2015, a subsidiary of the company acquired Palo Duro Wind Project Holdings, LLC and the Palo Duro wind facility in Texas.

In May 2015, the company completed the acquisition of 1,923 MW of contracted wind power projects from NextEra Energy Resources. The acquisition included facilities in North Dakota, Oklahoma, Oregon, and Washington.

Operations 

NextEra Energy Partners purchases and owns wind, solar power, and natural gas pipeline projects in North America.

Wind power projects 
NextEra Energy Partners has wind power projects in multiple North America locations, including:

Solar power projects 
NextEra Energy Partners has solar power projects in multiple North America locations, including:

See also 
 NextEra Energy Resources

References

External links 
 

NextEra Energy
Renewable energy companies of the United States
Companies based in Palm Beach County, Florida
Renewable resource companies established in 2014
2014 establishments in Florida
Companies listed on the New York Stock Exchange